Štadión Humenné is a multi-use stadium in Humenné, Slovakia.  It is currently used mostly for football matches and is the home ground of FK Humenné. The stadium was built in 1974 and its capacity was 10,000 people.

Reconstruction
The reconstruction of the stadium began in 2016n. The original capacity of 10.000 was decreased to 1,806 spectators. The estimated cost was €2.1 million. Slovak government provided €750.000 of the cost.

References

Football venues in Slovakia
Humenné
Humenné
Sports venues completed in 1974
Sport in Humenné